The white-headed brushfinch (Atlapetes albiceps) is a species of bird in the family Passerellidae.

It is found in Ecuador and Peru. Its natural habitats are subtropical or tropical dry forest and subtropical or tropical moist lowland forest.

References

white-headed brush finch
Birds of the Ecuadorian Andes
Birds of the Peruvian Andes
white-headed brush finch
white-headed brush finch
Taxonomy articles created by Polbot